Havva (حوا) is the Arabic and Turkish form of Eve, the first woman in Abrahamic religions. It is derived from Arabic Hawa (حواء), which in turn is loaned from Biblical Hebrew Chawwah (חוה).

People
 Havva Elmalı (born 2003), Turkish para athlete
 Havva Mammadova (born 1958), Azerbaijani politician

Turkish feminine given names
Azerbaijani feminine given names